Naftalan or Naphtalan is a type of crude oil. It is named after Naftalan, Azerbaijan, where it is found. It is known for its high naphthalene content and use in alternative medicine.

While Naftalan crude oil is too heavy for normal export uses (unlike Azerbaijan's plentiful Caspian Sea oil), it contains about 50 percent naphthenic hydrocarbons.

In Azerbaijan, people using the oil generally sit in a bath and are covered in oil up to their necks. There are numerous petroleum spas in the city of Naftalan itself.

History 
After the oil boom at the turn of the 20th century, the Baku naftalan started to be extracted in higher volumes, and exported to Germany. After the borders were closed following the 1917 Russian Revolution, it fell into oblivion in the west. It still attracted some attention in the Soviet Union, when the Azerbaijan Medical University opened a small health resort in 1933. In the 1930s, academician T. G. Pašaev started to try to isolate naphthalan from industrial paraffin and naphthene oils and proposed the term, though more current research indicates that the term "earth mineral oil” is more appropriate for what he described in his paper published in Moscow in 1959.

Health effects

Exposure to large amounts of naphthalene may damage or destroy red blood cells, most commonly in people with the inherited condition known as glucose-6-phosphate dehydrogenase (G6PD) deficiency, which over 400 million people suffer from. Humans, in particular children, have developed the condition known as hemolytic anemia, after ingesting mothballs or deodorant blocks containing naphthalene. Symptoms include fatigue, lack of appetite, restlessness, and pale skin. Exposure to large amounts of naphthalene may cause confusion, nausea, vomiting, diarrhea, blood in the urine, and jaundice (yellow coloration of the skin due to dysfunction of the liver).

The US National Toxicology Program (NTP) held an experiment where male and female rats and mice were exposed to naphthalene vapors on weekdays for two years. Both male and female rats exhibited evidence of carcinogenesis with increased incidences of adenoma and neuroblastoma of the nose. Female mice exhibited some evidence of carcinogenesis based on increased incidences of alveolar and bronchiolar adenomas of the lung, while male mice exhibited no evidence of carcinogenesis.

The International Agency for Research on Cancer (IARC) classifies naphthalene as possibly carcinogenic to humans and animals (Group 2B). The IARC also points out that acute exposure causes cataracts in humans, rats, rabbits, and mice; and that hemolytic anemia (described above) can occur in children and infants after oral or inhalation exposure or after maternal exposure during pregnancy. Under California's Proposition 65, naphthalene is listed as "known to the State to cause cancer". A probable mechanism for the carcinogenic effects of mothballs and some types of air fresheners containing naphthalene has been identified.

US government agencies have set occupational exposure limits to naphthalene exposure. The Occupational Safety and Health Administration has set a permissible exposure limit at 10 ppm (50 mg/m3) over an eight-hour time-weighted average. The National Institute for Occupational Safety and Health has set a recommended exposure limit at 10 ppm (50 mg/m3) over an eight-hour time-weighted average, as well as a short-term exposure limit at 15 ppm (75 mg/m3). Naphthalene's minimum odor threshold is 0.084 ppm for humans.

Mothballs and other products containing naphthalene have been banned within the EU since 2008.

In China, the use of naphthalene in mothballs is forbidden. Danger to human health and the common use of natural camphor are cited as reasons for the ban.

References

Petroleum
Pseudoscience
Alternative medicine
Naftalan, Azerbaijan
Naphthalenes